2MASS J18352154−3123385, often shortened to be 2MASS J1835, is a binary red dwarf system about 27 light-years from the Earth. It was first reported due to its high proper motion in 2010 by J. D. Kirkpatrick et al. It was then independently discovered from its X-ray radiation on June 10, 2015. Further investigation has shown the star to be a binary star with components of spectral type M6.5 and M8. They orbit each other in 1,400-1,800 years, and reached their closest point in mid-1968 assuming a constant proper motion. During their closest approach, they were separated by less than 0.1 arcsecond, compared to their current separation of 2 arcseconds.

Despite the fact that A and B are magnitude 12.5 and 13, respectively, their vicinity to the Earth was not noticed until 2015 due to the fact that it is in front of a relatively dense star field less than 15 degrees away from the Galactic Center. 

2MASS J1835A may be a flare star, due to many similar low-mass stars known to flare. It has not been observed to flare directly by 2015, however.

A 19th-magnitude star at   has been seen in the vicinity, with a similar proper motion to 2MASS J1835, but is probably not related as its proper motion is not as high as 2MASS J1835. Due to its dimness, insufficient data exists to determine its spectral type.

See also
 List of star systems within 25–30 light-years

Notes
 given date is not the date of periastron, but rather the date of the closest separation between 2MASS J1835A and B.

References

M-type main-sequence stars
Binary stars
J18352154–3123385
Flare stars
201000827
20150610
Sagittarius (constellation)